Sergey Narovchatov (1919–1981) was a Russian author and editor-in-chief of the literary magazine Novy Mir from 1974 to 1981.

Works
"Необычное литературоведение" (Unusual Study of Literature) (1970)
"Атлантида рядом с тобой" (Atlantis Next to You) (1972)
"Живая река" (Living River) (1974)

External links
http://peoples.ru/art/literature/poetry/contemporary/narovchatov/
http://samlib.ru/w/walxd_w_w/sergeynarovchatovrubysails.shtml

1919 births
1982 deaths
People from Khvalynsk
Communist Party of the Soviet Union members
Members of the Supreme Soviet of the Russian Soviet Federative Socialist Republic
Russian male poets
20th-century Russian poets
20th-century Russian male writers
Novy Mir editors
Soviet Army officers
Moscow State University alumni
Maxim Gorky Literature Institute alumni
Soviet military personnel of the Winter War
Soviet military personnel of World War II
Heroes of Socialist Labour
Recipients of the Order of Lenin
Recipients of the Order of the Red Banner of Labour
Recipients of the Order of the Red Star